Dhusha, now Benighat Rorang is a Rural Municipality in Dhading District in the Bagmati Zone of central Nepal. At the time of the 1991 Nepal census it had a population of 6350. The Dhusha VDC office is located at Charaundi Bazar, which is one of the Commencing place of the White Water Rafting in Trishuli River which started longway back. The bazar is also the main business area for the whole VDC which is located along the Prithvi Highway. Like the general geographical status of the whole country, Dhusha rises from low altitude to medium - high altitude region. Charaundi Khola (Charaundi Stream), flows very close to the bazar.

Dhusha proudly boasts as it is one of the few Rural Municipality (VDCs) in the country which serves the country producing tonnes and tonnes of vegetables all the year round which mainly comprises Cabbage, Brinjal, Bitter Gourd, Tomato etc. The vegetable are sent to Kalimati Vegetable Market in Kathmandu and also various cities and towns in the country including Mugling, Narayanghat, Pokhara, Biratnagar, Dharan. It's one of the gateway to the Chitwan District via walking trail.

Tourism can be the next source of income in the VDC as the area is rich with natural resources. White water rafting is the main attraction in the area. Trishuli River, which is one of the famous river for White Water Rafting in the country, flows in between Dhusha (Dhading District) and Ghaylchowk VDC (Gorkha District). The main rafting spots which are within the VDC are just 80 km (approx.) with some good resorts (Royal Beach Camp, Himalika Camp/Resort  etc.)mainly targeted for tourist are opened in the area. The VDC is just 80 km (approx.) from Kathmandu, the capital city. "Nohak Gupha (Nohak Cave)" also lies within the VDC which can be one of the longest cave in the country though it is yet to be publicized and verified. Canyoning in also a major attraction for local and foreign tourist in the VDC.

References

Populated places in Dhading District